The Scotland Sevens was a rugby sevens tournament that was part of the Sevens World Series. In the 2014-15 season it was the penultimate event of the Sevens World Series circuit. It was first held in 2007 but has been removed from the series from the 2015-16 season.

Between 2007 and 2011 the tournament was held at Murrayfield in Edinburgh, then moving to Scotstoun Stadium in Glasgow from 2012. The agreement to host the tournament in Glasgow between the World Rugby, which operates the Sevens World Series, and the Scottish Rugby Union ran from 2012 for at least 3 years. The event was replaced in the World Sevens series by the France Sevens event from 2015–16 and will not return to the series until 2019 at the earliest.

The first and second tournaments were held near the beginning of June, with Emirates Airline as the title sponsor. Associated events have included a Festival of Rugby, which took place on the training pitches outside Murrayfield when it was held there.

Results

See also
 Melrose Sevens

Notes and references

  
Rugby sevens competitions in Scotland
Rugby union in Edinburgh
Rugby union in Glasgow
Former World Rugby Sevens Series tournaments
Recurring sporting events established in 2007
Recurring sporting events disestablished in 2015
2007 establishments in Scotland